Dr. George Frederick Herbert Smith (1872–1953), was a British mineralogist who worked for the British Museum of Natural History. He discovered the mineral paratacamite in 1906. He also developed the first efficient jeweller's refractometer.

The mineral Herbertsmithite is named after him, as is Herbert's rock-wallaby.

References
webmineral.com Has information on Herbertsmithite and brief biographical details. Accessed March 2007
Archives of Herbert Smith's career 1897–1937 at the Natural History Museum

External links 

 Works by Herbert Smith at Project Gutenberg

1872 births
1953 deaths
British mineralogists
Employees of the British Museum